Martin Ulrich Nielsen (born July 24, 1973) is a Danish footballer and manager, most recently in charge of BK Søllerød-Vedbæk in the Danish 2nd Division East. He has played nine games for the Danish under-21 national team.

He has previously played for F.C. Copenhagen, FC Midtjylland, AGF Aarhus,  English side Huddersfield Town (on loan), Fremad Amager and BK Søllerød-Vedbæk. In December 1997 he had a trial at English club Sheffield Wednesday who were then in the Premier League, however this didn't lead to a transfer.

References

External links
Danish national team profile
 FCK profile
SoccerBase profile

1973 births
Living people
Danish men's footballers
Denmark under-21 international footballers
F.C. Copenhagen players
FC Midtjylland players
Aarhus Gymnastikforening players
Huddersfield Town A.F.C. players
Association football midfielders
English Football League players